The 1999 Chatham Cup was the 72nd annual nationwide knockout football competition in New Zealand.

Up to the last 16 of the competition, the cup was run in three regions (northern, central, and southern), with an open draw from the quarter-finals on. In all, 132 teams took part in the competition. Note: Different sources give different numberings for the rounds of the competition. Some record five rounds prior to the quarter-finals; others note a preliminary round followed by four rounds proper.

The 1999 final

Dunedin Technical made up for their big loss in the 1998 final, winning 4–0.

The Jack Batty Memorial Cup is awarded to the player adjudged to have made to most positive impact in the Chatham Cup final. The winner of the 1999 Jack Batty Memorial Cup was Aaron Burgess of Dunedin Technical.

Results

Third Round

* Won  on penalties by Eastern Suburbs (4-3)

Fourth Round

* Won  on penalties by Halswell United (8-7)

Fifth Round

* Won  on penalties by Tauranga City (4-1)

Quarter-finals

Semi-finals

Final

References

Rec.Sport.Soccer Statistics Foundation New Zealand 1999 page
UltimateNZSoccer website 1999 Chatham Cup page

Chatham Cup
Chatham Cup
Chatham Cup
Chat